Tortuguero Volcano, also known as Tortuguero Hill, is an extinct volcano located  WNW from Tortuguero, Costa Rica.

Toponymy 

It shares the name with the town and the Tortuguero National Park, which means "many turtles".

Physical aspects 

Pyroclastic cone, one of its sides was cut when the nearby canals were created.

Social and economic activity  

The volcano can be seen from the touristic areas of Tortuguero.

See also
 List of volcanoes in Costa Rica

References

External links

Volcanoes of Costa Rica
Mountains of Costa Rica
Geography of Limón Province
Pleistocene volcanoes